The St. Louis Cardinals 1991 season was the team's 110th season in St. Louis, Missouri and the 100th season in the National League.  The Cardinals rebounded from a rare last-place finish a year earlier to register a record of 84-78 during the season and finished 2nd to the Pittsburgh Pirates in the National League East division by fourteen games.

Ozzie Smith set the National League record for fewest errors in a season by a shortstop with 8 errors. Gold Gloves were awarded to catcher Tom Pagnozzi and shortstop Ozzie Smith this year.

Offseason
October 11, 1990: Ernie Camacho was released by the St. Louis Cardinals.

Regular season

Opening Day starters
Bernard Gilkey
Pedro Guerrero
Felix Jose
Ray Lankford
Jose Oquendo
Tom Pagnozzi
Ozzie Smith
Bob Tewksbury
Todd Zeile

Season standings

Record vs. opponents

Transactions
June 3, 1991: John Mabry was drafted by the St. Louis Cardinals in the 6th round of the 1991 amateur draft. Player signed June 11, 1991.

Roster

Player stats

Batting
Note: G = Games played; AB = At bats; H = Hits; Avg. = Batting average; HR = Home runs; RBI = Runs batted in

Other batters
Note; G = Games played; AB = At bats; H = Hits; Avg.= Batting average; HR = Home runs; RBI = Runs batted in

Starting pitchers 
Note: G = Games pitched; IP = Innings pitched: W = Wins; L = Losses; ERA = Earned run average; SO = Strikeouts

Other pitchers 
Note: G = Games pitched; IP = Innings pitched; W = Wins; L = Losses; ERA = Earned run average; SO = Strikeouts

Relief pitchers 
Note: G = Games pitched; W = Wins; L = Losses; SV = Saves; ERA = Earned run average; SO = Strikeouts

Awards and honors
 Tom Pagnozzi, catcher, National League Gold Glove
 Ozzie Smith, shortstop, National League Gold Glove

Farm system

References

External links
1991 St. Louis Cardinals at Baseball Reference
1991 St. Louis Cardinals team page at www.baseball-almanac.com

St. Louis Cardinals seasons
St Lou